Jordan High School is a senior high school in Fulshear, Texas. It is a part of the Katy Independent School District (KISD). It opened to students in 2020.

It was collectively named after the Jordan family. The building had a cost of over $206 million. Its size is above  of space. It has three gymnasiums, an eight-lane,  swimming pool area, and a 900-seat performing arts center. All the grade levels share the school equally, there are no specified grade level areas. Jordan High School also has 2 cafeterias to fit its many students.

Jordan is opening up year by year. The only grade levels of students in the 2020-2021 school year are the freshmen and the sophomores. In the 2021- 2022 school year, Jordan will have freshmen, sophomores, and juniors. In the 3rd year of operation, the 2022- 2023 school year, Jordan HS will hold all grade levels 9-12.The first class that will graduate out of the school will be the class of 2023, with a new graduating class every academic year following the 2023 graduation.

It is to take territory from Seven Lakes High School and Obra Tompkins High School. The school is the ninth comprehensive high school that its school district has established.

Jordan High School takes students in from Adams Junior High School and Seven Lakes Junior High School.

References

External links
 

Katy Independent School District high schools
Schools in Fort Bend County, Texas
2020 establishments in Texas
Educational institutions established in 2020